Spermacoceae is a tribe of flowering plants in the family Rubiaceae and contains about 1346 species in 57 genera. Its representatives are found in the tropics and subtropics.

Genera
Currently accepted names

 Agathisanthemum  (5 sp.)
 Amphiasma  (7 sp.)
 Amphistemon  (2 sp.)
 Anthospermopsis  (1 sp.)
 Arcytophyllum  (18 sp.)
 Astiella  (1 sp.)
 Bouvardia  (51 sp.)
 Carajasia  (1 sp.)
 Carterella  (1 sp.)
 Conostomium  (5 sp.)
 Cordylostigma  (9 sp.)
 Crusea  (15 sp.)
 Debia  (4 sp.)
 Dentella  (8 sp.)
 Dibrachionostylus  (1 sp.)
 Dimetia  (6 sp.)
 Diodella  (12 sp.)
 Diodia  (23 sp.)
 Edrastima  (5 sp.)
 Emmeorhiza  (1 sp.)
 Ernodea  (8 sp.)
 Exallage  (18 sp.)
 Galianthe  (48 sp.)
 Gomphocalyx  (1 sp.)
 Hedyotis  (182 sp.)
 Hedythyrsus  (3 sp.)
 Houstonia  (24 sp.)
 Hydrophylax  (1 sp.)
 Involucrella  (2 sp.)
 Kadua  (30 sp.)
 Kohautia  (28 sp.)
 Lathraeocarpa  (2 sp.)
 Lelya  (1 sp.)
 Leptopetalum  (8 sp.)
 Manettia  (125 sp.)
 Manostachya  (3 sp.)
 Mitracarpus  (65 sp.)
 Mitrasacmopsis  (1 sp.)
 Neanotis  (34 sp.)
 Nesohedyotis  (1 sp.)
 Oldenlandia  (217 sp.)
 Oldenlandiopsis  (1 sp.)
 Pentanopsis  (2 sp.)
 Pentodon  (2 sp.)
 Phylohydrax  (2 sp.)
 Planaltina  (3 sp.)
 Psyllocarpus  (9 sp.)
 Richardia  (16 sp.)
 Sacosperma  (2 sp.)
 Schwendenera  (1 sp.)
 Spermacoce  (286 sp.)
 Staelia  (21 sp.)
 Stenaria  (6 sp.)
 Stephanococcus  (1 sp.)
 Synaptantha  (2 sp.)
 Tessiera  (2 sp.)
 Thamnoldenlandia  (1 sp.)

Synonyms

Adenothola  = Manettia
Aeginetia  = Bouvardia
Allaeophania  = Hedyotis
Anistelma  = Hedyotis
Anotis  = Arcytophyllum
Arbulocarpus  = Spermacoce
Bigelovia  = Spermacoce
Bigelowia  = Spermacoce
Borreria  = Spermacoce
Chaenocarpus  = Spermacoce
Chamisme  = Houstonia
Chenocarpus  = Spermacoce
Conotrichia  = Manettia
Cormylus  = Oldenlandia
Covolia  = Spermacoce
Dasycephala  = Spermacoce
Decapenta  = Diodia
Dichrospermum  = Spermacoce
Diodioides  = Spermacoce
Dioneiodon  = Diodia
Diphragmus  = Tessiera
Diplophragma  = Hedyotis
Duvaucellia  = Kohautia
Dyctiospora  = Oldenlandia
Ebelia  = Diodia
Edrastenia  = Edrastima
Eionitis  = Oldenlandia
Endlichera  = Emmeorhiza
Endolasia  = Manettia
Endopogon  = Diodella
Ereicoctis  = Arcytophyllum
Gerontogea  = Oldenlandia
Gonotheca  = Leptopetalum
Gouldia  = Kadua
Gruhlmania  = Spermacoce
Guagnebina  = Manettia
Hemidiodia  = Spermacoce
Heymia  = Dentella
Hypodematium  = Spermacoce
Jurgensia  = Spermacoce
Karamyschewia  = Oldenlandia
Lippaya  = Dentella
Listeria  = Oldenlandia
Lygistum  = Manettia
Macrandria  = Hedyotis
Mallostoma  = Arcytophyllum
Metabolos  = Hedyotis
Metabolus  = Hedyotis
Mitratheca  = Oldenlandia
Nacibea  = Manettia
Neosabicea  = Manettia
Octodon  = Spermacoce
Panetos  = Houstonia
Paragophyton  = Spermacoce
Peltospermum  = Sacosperma
Pleiocraterium  = Hedyotis
Plethyrsis  = Richardia
Poederiopsis  = Manettia
Poiretia  = Houstonia
Pseudrachicallis  = Arcytophyllum
Pterostephus  = Spermacoce
Richardsonia  = Richardia
Sarissus  = Hydrophylax
Schiedea  = Richardia
Schizangium  = Mitracarpus
Sclerococcus  = Hedyotis
Scleromitrion  = Hedyotis
Spermacoceodes  = Spermacoce
Staurospermum  = Mitracarpus
Stelmanis  = Oldenlandia
Stelmotis  = Oldenlandia
Symphyllarion  = Hedyotis
Tardavel  = Spermacoce
Teinosolen  = Arcytophyllum
Terrellianthus  = Arcytophyllum
Thecagonum  = Leptopetalum
Thecorchus  = Oldenlandia
Theyodis  = Oldenlandia
Triodon  = Diodia
Vanessa  = Manettia
Wiegmannnia  = Kadua

References

 
Rubioideae tribes